Platon Sergeevich Panjutin (1889 – 1946) was a Russian chemist, botanist, naturalist, and mountain climber. He collected botanical specimens in the southern part of the Caucasus Mountains in Abkhazia.

In 1913 the botanist G. Sakharov collected a snowdrop (genus Galanthus) near Gagra at 1600 meters. After studying the botanical specimen, Panjutin named its species Galanthus valentinae. However, Panjutin did not validly publish the name according to the rules of the International Code of Botanical Nomenclature. For about a century, botanists regarded G. valentinae as a synonym for G. krasnovii. In 2008 Dmitri Zubov and Olga Bondareva collected in western Transcaucasia a snowdrop specimen. According to Zubov and Aaron P. Davis (from Kew) the 2008 specimen belonged to the same species as Sakharov's 1913 specimen and, furthermore, the two specimens belonged to a species different from the 19 known species in the genus Galanthus. Zubov and Davis named the new species Galanthus panjutinii in honor of Panjutin.

Eponyms
 Galanthus panjutinii

Selected publications
 
 
 Panjutin, P. S. "Tall herbaceous vegetation of the West Caucasus." Izvestia Russk Geogr Obschestva 71, no. 9 (1939): 27-45.
 Panjutin, P. S. "Mires of Colchide." Botanicheskii Zhurnal of USSR 27, no. 5 (1942): 94-107.

References

1889 births
1946 deaths
Soviet botanists
Soviet chemists
Soviet mountain climbers